All Our Yesterdays may refer to:

Television 
 "All Our Yesterdays" (Star Trek: The Original Series), a 1969 episode of Star Trek: The Original Series
 All Our Yesterdays (TV series), a UK popular history programme

Literature 
 "Tomorrow and tomorrow and tomorrow", a soliloquy from Macbeth, Act 5 Scene 5, and the origin of the phrase
 All Our Yesterdays (book), a 1969 history of 1940s science fiction fandom, by Harry Warner, Jr.
 All Our Yesterdays (novel), a 1994 novel by Robert B. Parker

Music 
 All Our Yesterdays, a compilation album by Alien Sex Fiend 
 All Our Yesterdays (EP), a 2011 EP by Verah Falls
 All Our Yesterdays (Blackmore's Night album), 2015
 "All Our Yesterdays", a song by Alan Parsons
 "All Our Yesterdays", a song by Allan Holdsworth from his album Atavachron
”All Our Yesterdays”, a song by Mac Demarco from his album “Here Comes the Cowboy”